Joseph Flaherty (born June 21, 1941) is an American actor, writer, and comedian. He is best known for his work on the Canadian sketch comedy SCTV from 1976 to 1984 (on which he also served as a writer), and as Harold Weir on Freaks and Geeks, and for his role in Happy Gilmore (1996).

Life and career
Joseph O'Flaherty was born in Pittsburgh, Pennsylvania, the son of a production clerk at Westinghouse Electric. His father was of Irish heritage and his mother was of Italian descent.

He moved to Chicago, where he started his comedy career with the Second City Theater as Joe O'Flaherty. Along with several other Second City performers, he began appearing on the National Lampoon Radio Hour from 1973 to 1974. After seven years in Chicago, he moved to Toronto to help establish the Toronto Second City theatre troupe. During those years, he was one of the original writer/performers on SCTV, where he spent eight years on the show, playing such characters as Big Jim McBob (of Farm Film Report fame), Count Floyd/Floyd Robertson, and station owner/manager Guy Caballero, who goes around in a wheelchair only for respect and undeserved sympathy.

Other memorable Flaherty characterizations included emotional talk-show host Sammy Maudlin, seedy saxophonist-private eye Vic Arpeggio, aggressive elocution lecturer Norman Gorman, myopic public-television host Hugh Betcha, and "crazy as a snake" ex-convict Rocco.

SCTV ceased production in 1984. The same year, Flaherty played Count Floyd in a short film that was shown at concerts by the rock band Rush before the song "The Weapon", for their tour in support of Grace Under Pressure (and can be seen in the home video, Grace Under Pressure Tour).

Flaherty has appeared in a number of cult-favorite films, for example, playing the part of the Western Union postal worker who delivers Doc Brown's 70-year-old letter to Marty McFly in Back to the Future Part II (1989), as well as the crazed fan yelling "jackass!" in Happy Gilmore. In season eight of Family Guy, Flaherty once again played the Western Union man in "Something, Something, Something, Dark Side". He likewise satirizes his Back to the Future Part II character in "The Big Bang Theory", this time playing a Vatican worker whose role is essentially identical to that of his Western Union character.

In 1989, Flaherty played a guest role in Married... with Children in the season-four episode "Tooth or Consequences", as a recently divorced dentist who must repair Al Bundy's teeth.

During 1997–1998, Flaherty starred in the television adaptation of Police Academy (Police Academy: The Series) as Cmdt. Stuart Hefilfinger. The series lasted for only one season.

In 1999, Flaherty joined the cast of Freaks and Geeks, an NBC hour-long dramedy set in the 1980–1981 academic year, in which he played Harold Weir, the irascible father of two teens. Despite a dedicated cult following, the show only lasted one season. In the third episode, "Tricks and Treats", he dons a cheap vampire costume reminiscent of his "Count Floyd" character of the depicted era.

He made appearances on the CBS sitcom The King of Queens as Father McAndrew, the priest at the Heffernans' church. He starred on the Bite TV original program, Uncle Joe's Cartoon Playhouse, and served as a judge on the CBC program The Second City's Next Comedy Legend.

From 2001 to 2004, he had appeared in various Disney shows and films, including The Legend of Tarzan and Home on the Range.

Beginning in 2004, Flaherty was a member of the faculty at Humber College, where he taught a comedy-writing course. He was also on the program's advisory committee.

Discography
Gold Turkey (National Lampoon album, 1975)
Count Floyd (1982) (RCA)

Filmography

Characterizations
Celebrities impersonated by Flaherty on SCTV include: Kirk Douglas, Charlton Heston, William F. Buckley, Jack Klugman, Robert Mitchum, Bing Crosby, Don Knotts, Yassir Arafat, Richard Nixon, Alistair Cooke, Slim Whitman, the corpse of Albert Schweitzer, Gregory Peck, Eddie Anderson (as 'Rochester'), Alan Alda, Elvis Presley, Hugh Beaumont, John Huston, Larry Fine, Pope Paul VI, Geraldo Rivera, Art Garfunkel, Broderick Crawford, Jacques Cousteau, Lowell Thomas, Henry Fonda, Marcello Mastroianni, Sylvester Stallone, Shoo Boxx, Paul Bradley, Aaron Copland, Dom DiMaggio, Dick Beddoes, Gavin MacLeod, Prince Philip, Tom Wolfe, Peter O'Toole, Salvador Dalí, Gene Siskel, Hugh Hefner, and musician Paul Revere.

Flaherty appeared in a cameo in the deleted scenes from Anchorman as the salacious News Director who first employs Rita Genkin after her graduation from Syracuse University. He encourages her to wear a swimsuit to do the weather.

Flaherty appeared as an immigration Royal Canadian Mounted Police officer in the "Canadian Road Trip" episode of That '70s Show alongside fellow SCTV member Dave Thomas.

In the third episode of Freaks and Geeks, "Tricks and Treats", he is dressed up as a vampire, a reference to his character Count Floyd.

References

External links
 
 
 Interview on The Sound of Young America, 9/06

1941 births
20th-century American male actors
21st-century American male actors
20th-century American comedians
21st-century American comedians
Living people
Male actors from Pittsburgh
American expatriate male actors in Canada
American male film actors
American male television actors
American male voice actors
American people of Irish descent
American writers of Italian descent
American sketch comedians
American television writers
Comedians from Pennsylvania
Male actors from Pennsylvania
American male television writers
Screenwriters from Pennsylvania
Primetime Emmy Award winners
Best Supporting Actor in a Drama Series Canadian Screen Award winners